Lisa Joy (born May 23, 1977) is an American screenwriter, director, producer, and attorney. She is best known as the co-creator, writer, director, and executive producer of the HBO science-fiction drama series Westworld (2016–2022). For her work on the series, she received multiple Primetime Emmy Award nominations. Joy's other work includes the ABC comedy series Pushing Daisies (2007–2009) and the USA Network crime drama series Burn Notice (2009–2011). In 2021, she made her feature film directorial debut with Reminiscence.

Early life
Lisa Joy was raised in New Jersey. Her parents are both immigrants, her father is English and her mother is Taiwanese.

Joy graduated from Stanford University and worked as a consultant at McKinsey & Company in Los Angeles before attending Harvard Law School. Joy was admitted to the bar in 2009 and practiced law in California prior to her career in entertainment.

Career
While studying for the bar, Joy submitted a sample script for the ABC fantasy comedy-drama series Pushing Daisies. A friend passed the script along to a television producer, helping her get the job as a staff writer in 2007. She went on to become the only female writer on the USA Network crime drama series Burn Notice. She later served as a co-producer on the series.

In 2016, Joy co-created the HBO science fiction series Westworld and serves as its co-showrunner. Westworld had four seasons. The series focuses on "a futuristic theme park gone wrong where robots start rebelling against humans". The series went on to become one of the most popular series on television. For her work on the series, Joy earned nominations for the Primetime Emmy Award for Outstanding Drama Series and Outstanding Writing for a Drama Series, among others.

Joy, along with her husband Jonathan Nolan, signed a new deal with Amazon to write and produce a series for the company. The deal is worth $150 million over five years. As a part of the deal, Joy and Nolan were announced as executive producers on a science fiction series The Peripheral and an adaptation of the post-apocalyptic video game series Fallout.

Joy's feature film debut, Reminiscence, was released by Warner Bros. Pictures in US cinemas on August 20, 2021, to mixed reviews and was a commercial failure.

Personal life
Joy married screenwriter Jonathan Nolan, the younger brother of director Christopher Nolan. The two first met at the premiere of the elder Nolan's film Memento.

The couple have a daughter and a son.

Filmography
Film

Television

Awards and nominations

References

External links

 
 
 

Living people
American television producers
American women television producers
People from New Jersey
American television writers
American screenwriters
Harvard Law School alumni
American people of English descent
American people of Taiwanese descent
American women writers of Chinese descent
Stanford University alumni
American women television writers
Showrunners
21st-century American women
1977 births